Feridun Hamdullahpur  (born ) is the chancellor of International Business University. Previously, he was the president and vice-chancellor of the University of Waterloo. Hamdullahpur was named the sixth president of the University of Waterloo in March 2011. Hamdullahpur's term ended on July 1, 2021, when his successor, Vivek Goel, took office.

Early life
Hamdullahpur was born in Turkey to an Iranian Azerbaijani father and a Turkish mother. He is the youngest of five brothers. His businessman father, Nasri, died of liver disease before Hamdullahpur turned one. His mother, Merziye, raised her five sons in Turkey. He moved from Turkey to Nova Scotia in 1981 where he met his wife, Cathy. Cathy was 21, a fourth-year nursing student at Dalhousie University.
They married in Halifax on June 28, 1985, and later traveled to Turkey for a small ceremony with family.

Education
Hamdullahpur attended the Istanbul Technical University earning his undergraduate degree and his master's in mechanical engineering. He moved to Canada to do a PhD at the Technical University of Nova Scotia, which is now part of Dalhousie University.

Prior to being appointed president, Hamdullahpur was Waterloo's vice president academic and provost, a role which he held for just over a year before being appointed interim president. Prior to this, Hamdullahpur held various roles at Carleton University in Ottawa, Ontario, Canada.

Career 
After completing his time as president and vice-chancellor of the University of Waterloo, Hamdullahpur continues to serve on several boards, including as a board director for AMTD Group that he began serving on in 2019. He also currently serves as a member of ApplyBoard's Canadian Advisory Board and as a member of the Honorary Treasurer for the Association of Commonwealth Universities.

He was appointed to the Order of Canada in 2022.

See also
 List of University of Waterloo people

References

Presidents of the University of Waterloo
Turkish expatriates in Canada
Istanbul Technical University alumni
Living people
1950s births
Turkish people of Iranian descent
Iranian expatriates in Canada
Recipients of the Order of Merit of the Republic of Turkey
Members of the Order of Canada